Central Avenue/Camelback, also known as Uptown Phoenix, is a station on the Metro light rail line in uptown Phoenix, Arizona, United States. This station has a park and ride lot adjacent to and west of the station, along Camelback Road.

Notable places nearby

 Brophy College Preparatory
 Xavier College Preparatory
 Central High School

Ridership

References

External links
 Valley Metro map

Valley Metro Rail stations in Phoenix, Arizona
Railway stations in the United States opened in 2008
2008 establishments in Arizona